Class 5 may refer to:
 Class 5 telephone switch
 Class V (U.S. Army), ammunition of all types, and associated items
 SCORE Class 5, off-road racing Baja Bug
 TS Class 5, tram used in Trondheim, Norway
 The fifth class in terms of hiking difficulty in the Yosemite Decimal System
 Class 5 truck, US truck class for medium trucks, up to 19,500 pounds weight limit

Locomotives 
 BR Standard Class 5, British 4-6-0 steam locomotive
NSB El 5, Norwegian electric locomotive
 NSB Di 5, Norwegian diesel locomotive
L&YR Class 5, British 2-4-2T steam locomotive
 NSB Class 5, Norwegian standard-gauge steam locomotive
 NSB Class V, Norwegian narrow-gauge steam locomotive

See also
 Class V (disambiguation)
 Class 05 (disambiguation)